Scott Neri (born 1972 in Guadalajara, Jalisco) is a Mexican painter, illustrator, designer and short fiction writer. He was the founding member and director of the Guadalajara-based online community for artists Tomarte, and art director of EterUltra Studios.

Artistic development 
Scott Neri was born in Guadalajara in 1972. He studied Visual Arts at the University of Guadalajara from 1987 to 1991, screenwriting at Centro de Actores y Autores de Occidente under the mentorship of Oscar Trejo, and Cinema at the Centro de Arte Audiovisual. His first individual exhibition named M Impresionismo Bizarro (M Bizarre Impressionism) was held in 1992. He has taken part in several collective exhibitions in New York City, Madrid and Guadalajara. He has attended workshops with renowned Mexican writers José Agustín and Juan José Arreola. Neri has described his artwork as a personal incursion into pop surrealism and imaginism.

Exhibitions

2002 - Personal Sin Quotes - Galería Arte Estudio - Individual, M Impresionismo Bizarro - Les Fleurs du Mort, Centro de Arte Audio Visual, GDL - Individual
2003 - Guadalajara en un Llano - Tomarte en Vigo, Spain - Collective, Exhibition of Mexican Art - Tomarte en Madrid, Spain - Collective, Obscure Journeys I - Jorge Martínez Gallery, GDL - Collective, Revolucionarte - Tomarte, Zapopan, Jalisco - Collective, Cinema Roxy Bar - GDL - Collective, Casa Arcos - GDL - Collective
2004 - La Quema del Diablo - Casa Arcos, GDL - Collective, Puppet - La Santa Bar, GDL - Individual, Festival de las Nuevas Artes - Expo GDL - Collective, Latex - Museo de la Ciudad, Saltillo - Collective, Obscure Journeys II - Casa Vieja, GDL - Collective, 30th Anniversary of Radio UdeG - GDL - Collective, Blood of Cain - Les Fleurs du Mort, Bar Galería, Foro de Arte y Cultura, Swinger Bar Gallery, GDL - Individual, Cuerpo Presente - Museo de la Ciudad, Saltillo - Collective, Under the Skin - La Comuna Taller Galería, GDL - Collective
2005 - A Lubrik Vision - Bolko Bar Gallery, GDL - Collective of erotic art, Se Busca Coleccionista Novel - Humo Gallery, GDL - Collective, I want to see Blood - Ex-Convento del Carmen, GDL - Collective, Sinner - Jadite Gallery, New York City - Collective, X - Cunorte UdeG, Colotlán, Redibú Bar, Ajolote Gallery, GDL - Individual, Expo Santa Fe - Santo Coyote, GDL - Collective, La Mata Tinta, GDL - Collective, Permanent Sephirot - Opio Club, GDL - Individual

Short fiction 

Ritos, 1997
Extrañas Entrañas, 1998

External links 
 
Trifasiko
Official website of YoArtista

References 

1972 births
Living people
Mexican artists
People from Guadalajara, Jalisco
Artists from Guadalajara, Jalisco